Cyril Haran (7 February 1931 – 25 June 2014) was a Gaelic footballer and manager, priest, scholar and schoolteacher. He managed the Sligo county team.

Biography
Cyril Haran was born in February 1931. He had three sisters: Grace Liddy (who predeceased him), Margo (based in Sligo at her brother's death) and Sr Vickey Haran (based in the U.S. state of California at that time). He played Gaelic football for Grange as a youth during the 1940s and would go on to become club president. He taught English at Summerhill College in Sligo (where he was known as "Cyrilly" or "Dosser"), as well as training the school's soccer and Gaelic football teams. He also taught at St Muredach's College in Ballina, County Mayo, and spent time teaching at the University of San Diego in 1968.

He managed St Mary's to their first Sligo Senior Football Championship title; in 1977, they were the first Sligo club to win a Connacht Senior Club Football Championship title. In 1978,
he managed St Mary's to a Sligo Football Championship semi-final against Grange, won by Grange in a replay.

He managed the Sligo county team between 1983 and 1985. Other teams he managed were Roscommon Gaels and St Michael's. He was noted for telling his teams: "Lads, winning isn't everything", then to pause and follow through with "It's the only thing". His enjoyments included literature and fishing.

The Very Reverend Fr. Haran spent 58 years as a priest. He was ordained in 1956 and went on to be curate in Roscommon and Sooey. In 1988, he was posted to Grange as CC and became parish priest of Ahamlish and Inishmurray in 1997. His retirement came in 2003. He received a celebration Mass and presentation. He spent it at Streedagh until he died from a short illness at the North West Hospice in June 2014 at the age of 83. His funeral was held at Church of Mary Immaculate, Grange, and he was buried afterwards in Sligo Cemetery.

References

1931 births
2014 deaths
Gaelic football managers
Gaelic games club administrators
20th-century Irish Roman Catholic priests
Irish schoolteachers
Sportspeople from County Sligo
Teachers of English